Tonglu County is a county of Zhejiang Province, East China, it is under the administration of the prefecture-level city of Hangzhou, the capital of Zhejiang.

The subdivisions of Tonglu County include a She ethnic township.

They are called China's Kuaidi Tonglu Gang.

Administrative divisions
Subdistricts:
Tongjun Subdistrict (桐君街道), Jiuxian Subdistrict (旧县街道)

Towns:
Fuchunjiang (富春江镇), Hengcun (横村镇), Fenshui (分水镇), Fengchuan (凤川镇), Baijiang (百江镇), Yaolin (瑶琳镇), Jiangnan (江南镇)

Townships:
Zhongshan Township (钟山乡), Xinhe Township (新合乡), Hecun Township (合村乡), Eshan She Ethnic Township (莪山畲族乡)

Climate

Transportation
The county is served by Tonglu railway station.

References

External links
Tonglu County government's official website

Geography of Hangzhou
County-level divisions of Zhejiang